Würzburg is an electoral constituency (German: Wahlkreis) represented in the Bundestag. It elects one member via first-past-the-post voting. Under the current constituency numbering system, it is designated as constituency 251. It is located in northwestern Bavaria, comprising the city of Würzburg and the district of Landkreis Würzburg.

Würzburg was created for the inaugural 1949 federal election. Since 2005, it has been represented by Paul Lehrieder of the Christian Social Union (CSU).

Geography
Würzburg is located in northwestern Bavaria. As of the 2021 federal election, it comprises the independent city of Würzburg and the district of Landkreis Würzburg.

History
Würzburg was created in 1949. In the 1949 election, it was Bavaria constituency 40 in the numbering system. In the 1953 through 1961 elections, it was number 235. In the 1965 through 1998 elections, it was number 237. In the 2002 and 2005 elections, it was number 252. Since the 2009 election, it has been number 251.

Originally, the constituency comprised the independent city of Würzburg and the districts of Landkreis Würzburg, Ochsenfurt, and Marktheidenfeld. In the 1965 through 1972 elections, it lost the Marktheidenfeld district. It acquired its current borders in the 1976 election.

Members
The constituency has been held continuously by the Christian Social Union (CSU) since its creation. It was first represented by Wilhelm Laforet from 1949 to 1953, followed by Karl Alfred Kihn from 1953 to 1961. Linus Memmel was representative from 1961 to 1976. Wolfgang Bötsch then served from 1976 to 2005, a total of eight consecutive terms. Paul Lehrieder has been representative since 2005.

Election results

2021 election

2017 election

2013 election

2009 election

References

Federal electoral districts in Bavaria
1949 establishments in West Germany
Constituencies established in 1949
Würzburg
Würzburg (district)